Boris Herrmann (born 26 May 1981) is a German yachtsman.

Sailing career 
In 2001 Boris Herrmann was the youngest (and only German) participant in the Mini Transat race, a single-handed yacht race across the Atlantic. He came to finish eleventh which earned him his first larger appearance in the yachting press. In 2006 Herrmann finished second in the European Championship as well as in the German Championship in the 505 class. He also competed in the 505 World Championships finishing 17th in 2005, 7th in 2006 and 9th in 2007 in highly competitive 100+ boat fleets. In spring 2008 Herrmann sailed his Class 40 yacht “Beluga Racer” to a second in the Artemis Transat, the oldest transatlantic regatta for single-handed yachts.

Boris Herrmann won the Portimão Global Ocean Race, a five leg regatta around the world for Class 40 boats. He and his co-skipper Felix Oehme (the Beluga Offshore Sailing Team) came to win three of the five legs of the race, and left behind the team Desafio Cabo de Hornos. This makes them the first German professional team on a German yacht to win a leg of an international trans-ocean race and the whole race itself.

On 29 July 2019, it was announced that Boris Herrmann was to sail climate activist Greta Thunberg from Plymouth to New York City in mid-late August 2019 on his emission-free racing yacht Malizia II.  They departed on 14 August 2019 and arrived on 28 August the same year.

In 2020/2021 Boris Herrmann was the first German (apart from the Franco-German Isabelle Joschke) to take part in the prestigious 2020 - Vendée Globe, which started on 8 November 2020 in front of Les Sables-d'Olonne in the Vendée department in France. He crossed the finish line in 5th place with an elapsed time of 80d 20h 59m 45s. In total Boris Herrmann achieved 5th place between Jean Le Cam on 4th and Thomas Ruyant on 6th place. Due to a granted time compensation of 6 hours as part of the rescue of Kevin Escoffier in late November 2020, Boris Herrmann came out with a total regatta time of 80d 14h 59m 45s.

References

Sources 
 Article at Seglermagazin.de Artemis Transat 2008: Boris Herrmann sensationell Zweiter 30. Mai 2008
 Article at Manager Magazin "Man liegt immer auf der Lauer" 15. November 2008
 Article at Spiegel Online Deutsche Segler mit historischem Erfolg 16. November 2008
 Article at Spiegel Online Herrmann und Oehme gewinnen Portimão Global Race 21. Juni 2009
 Official Website: The Transat - The North Atlantic Alone (English/French)

External links 
 
 

1981 births
Living people
German male sailors (sport)
Greta Thunberg
IMOCA 60 class sailors
German Vendee Globe sailors
2020 Vendee Globe sailors
Vendée Globe finishers
Single-handed circumnavigating sailors
Sportspeople from Oldenburg